Félix de los Heros Azcueta (21 January 1910 – March 1984), also known as Tache, was a Spanish footballer from Bilbao in the Basque Country who played as a midfielder.

Football career
It is unclear where or when de los Heros started his playing career but in 1932 he was playing for Barakaldo FC. In 1934 he moved to Sevilla FC. Late in 1936 he joined Gimnástico de Valencia. In 1937, in the middle of the Spanish Civil War, he joined Barcelona FC. His first game for them was on the 16 May 1937 against the Catalan national team. He never actually played for them in the domestic league but participated in the Barcelona FC tour of North America later in 1937. When the tour ended he signed for Brooklyn Hispano, a United States team that played in the American Soccer League. Later he moved to Mexico where he played for Club Deportivo Euzkadi in the Primera Fuerza league for the 1938/39 season. He also played for the Basque Country national football team twice during that period. Later he joined Club España, before going on to play in several other Mexican teams.

References 

La Liga players
Expatriate footballers in Mexico
Spanish expatriate footballers
Spanish footballers
1910 births
Association football midfielders
Footballers from Bilbao
Expatriate soccer players in the United States
1984 deaths
C.D. Veracruz footballers
Real Club España footballers
FC Barcelona players
Sevilla FC players
Barakaldo CF footballers
Spanish expatriate sportspeople in Mexico
Liga MX players